The men's standing high jump was one of six jumping events on the athletics at the 1908 Summer Olympics programme in London. The competition was held on July 23, 1908. 23 high jumpers from eleven nations competed. NOCs could enter up to 12 athletes. The event was won by Ray Ewry of the United States, his third consecutive victory in the event. Ewry won all eight standing jump events from 1900 to 1908 as well as both events at the 1906 Intercalated Games. Konstantinos Tsiklitiras of Greece took silver, tying with American John Biller. Tsiklitiras was the first non-American to medal in the event; the United States had swept the medals in both 1900 and 1904.

Background

This was the third appearance of the event, which was held four times from 1900 to 1912. Two-time defending champion (three-time if the 1906 Intercalated Games are counted) Ray Ewry of the United States was heavily favored.

Australasia, Belgium, Canada, Denmark, France, Germany, Great Britain, Greece, Norway, and Sweden each made their debut in the event. The United States made its third appearance, the only nation to have competed in each appearance of the event to that point.

Competition format

There were two rounds of jumping, though the results from the qualifying round carried over to the final. The top four jumpers in the qualifying round advanced to the final. Each competitor received three attempts at each height. The judges determined the initial height of the bar and any increases. "Diving" and "somersaulting" were not allowed.

Records

These were the standing world and Olympic records (in metres) prior to the 1908 Summer Olympics.

No new world or Olympic records were set during the competition.

Schedule

Results

References

Sources
 Official Report of the Games of the IV Olympiad (1908).
 De Wael, Herman. Herman's Full Olympians: "Athletics 1908". Accessed 7 April 2006.

Athletics at the 1908 Summer Olympics
1908